Thayre is a surname. Notable people with the surname include:

Ezra Thayre (1791–1862), American Mormon convert and leader
Frederick Thayre (1894–1917), British flying ace

See also
Thayer (name)